Lillestrøm Sportsklubb is a Norwegian professional football club from the city of Lillestrøm, just outside of the capital Oslo. Lillestrøm SK is a Norwegian football club based in Lillestrøm, playing in Eliteserien. The club was founded in 1917, after the merger of two local football clubs.  Their home ground is Åråsen Stadion, which has a capacity of 12,250 people, while the principal training ground is Lillestrøm stadion, or the indoor arena, LSK-Hallen. The club holds the Norwegian record for the most consecutive years without being relegated, having played 45 seasons from 1975 until 2019. Over the years the club has had around 40 players who have represented the Norwegian national team. There has also been a number of foreigners who have represented the national teams of Sweden, Iceland, Senegal, Finland, Malta, Australia, South Africa, Slovenia, Tunisia, Canada, Somalia and Nigeria.

History
Lillestrøm SK was founded on 2 April 1917. It has been Norwegian League champions five times, most recently in 1989, and also in 1986, 1977, 1976 and 1959. Additionally, they have won the Norwegian Cup in 1985, 1981, 1978, 1977, 2007 and 2017.

When Arne Erlandsen left for Sweden and IFK Göteborg after the 2004 season, former LSK player and German international Uwe Rösler took over as head coach of the team. His first season in charge became a successful one, with Lillestrøm finishing fourth in the league. This position secured LSK a place in the Royal League. The team also made it to the 2005 Norwegian Cup final, but lost 4–2 to Molde in front of a crowd of 25,000 at Ullevaal Stadion.

In the 2006 season Lillestrøm were among the top favourites to win the league. Following a disappointing 4th place, it was announced on 13 November 2006 that Uwe Rösler had been fired from his position as head coach of Lillestrøm. Only a few days later Tom Nordlie signed a three-year contract.

A key signing ahead of the 2007 season included Fredrikstad's Simen Brenne, an attacking midfielder with a knack for scoring important goals. LSK under Nordlie played a 4–3–3 system, which invites rapid transitional play between defence and attack, Lillestrøm finished fourth in the league and won the 2007 Norwegian cup, beating Haugesund 2–0 in the final at Ullevaal Stadion.

On 29 May 2008, Tom Nordlie resigned from his position as head coach after a disappointing start of the 2008 season. Statements from Nordlie suggested that fundamental disagreements with club director Jan Åge Fjørtoft also contributed to his resignation. It later emerged that the conflict between the controversial coach and the players was another big contributor behind Nordlie's departure, his punishing training regime in the run-up to the 2008 season being cited as the main complaint. Nordlie, no stranger to controversy during his career, had reportedly "lost the dressing room" as early as autumn 2007.

Erland Johnsen and Frode Grodås stepped in as caretakers until a new head coach was hired. On 19 August 2008, the club announced that Henning Berg would take over as head coach on 1 January 2009, after leaving his post at Lyn. Berg's first task would be to rescue the team from relegation, a feat he accomplished in his very first match as head coach. LSK beat Rosenborg 4–2 in a classic encounter to secure their place in the Tippeligaen.

The 2009 season was one of great upheaval. In an increasingly tight economic position, LSK sold or released 11 players before and during the season, with Berg also restructuring the squad and bringing in new talent. Enormous injury problems also made the start to the season a difficult one for Berg's charges. After 9 games, LSK had won none and drawn four and seemed destined for relegation. An impressive comeback saw Lillestrøm deliver a strong second half to the season, eventually finishing 11th. Newcomer Nosa Igiebor had an especially impressive first season in the Lillestrøm jersey.

The team continued to impress over the course of the winter and start of the 2010 season. LSK were in early June fifth in the Tippeligaen, undefeated in 14 league matches. They saw, however, a dramatic drop in form over the summer which saw them briefly flirt with relegation, before a late surge of form late in the season salvaged 10th place.

In 2011 LSK made an exciting start to the new season, scoring an incredible 18 goals from their first five league matches, including a 7–0 drubbing of Stabæk in their first league match of the season – away from home. Early season form was good enough for the team to flirt with the top three until the end of July. Early in August, however, stars Anthony Ujah and Nosa Igiebor were sold to stave off the dire economic straits of the club. Also, in-form Icelandic midfielder Stefán Gíslason was out of contract and left the club. In mid-August, prodigy striker Björn Bergmann Sigurðarson was injured for the rest of the season, and the club failed to win any of their last 11 league games, a new record for Lillestrøm.

Coach Henning Berg was sacked three matches before the end of the season as investor Per Berg promised fresh funds for acquiring quality players after the season. The club again flirted with the prospect of relegation; however, the incessant poor form of Start and Sarpsborg meant Lillestrøm again saved themselves. This despite an abject 34 points gathered over 30 league matches, which normally would mean relegation.

Former Elfsborg coach Magnus Haglund was appointed coach after the season. Lillestrøm was quite active in the transfer window ahead of the 2012 season, and bought 11 new players. The change of coach and flurry of transfers did the club no good, however, as they again flirted with relegation until just a few weeks before the end of the season, hovering between 12th and 14th place before a strong finish to the season propelled them into 9th. On the whole the season was deemed a big disappointment, however, and Haglund's position has been subject to debate throughout the winter pre-season.

Ahead of the 2013 season, the club again has reined in spending and started the season with a first team squad of just 18 full senior players and additional backup players from the youth academy. LSK under Haglund have performed well away from home (2nd best away record in 2012), but often struggled on their own turf.

Achievements 

Eliteserien:
Winners (5): 1958–59, 1976, 1977, 1986, 1989
Runners-up (8): 1959–60, 1978, 1983, 1985, 1988, 1994, 1996, 2001
Norwegian Cup:
Winners (6): 1977, 1978, 1981, 1985, 2007, 2017
Runners-up (7): 1953, 1955, 1958, 1980, 1986, 1992, 2005
Royal League:
Runners-up (1): 2005–06
UEFA Intertoto Cup:
Runners-up (1): 2006

Recent history 
{|class="wikitable"
|-bgcolor="#efefef"
! Season
!
! Pos.
! Pl.
! W
! D
! L
! GS
! GA
! P
!Cup
!Notes
|-
|1995
|Tippeligaen
|align=right |4
|align=right|26||align=right|11||align=right|8||align=right|7
|align=right|50||align=right|36||align=right|41
|bgcolor=cc9966|Semi-final
|
|-
|1996
|Tippeligaen
|align=right bgcolor=silver|2
|align=right|26||align=right|13||align=right|7||align=right|6
|align=right|54||align=right|33||align=right|46
||Third round
|
|-
|1997
|Tippeligaen
|align=right |10
|align=right|26||align=right|9||align=right|6||align=right|11
|align=right|41||align=right|49||align=right|33
||Fourth round
|
|-
|1998
|Tippeligaen
|align=right |8
|align=right|26||align=right|9||align=right|5||align=right|12
|align=right|34||align=right|43||align=right|32
||Third round
|
|-
|1999
|Tippeligaen
|align=right |4
|align=right|26||align=right|15||align=right|3||align=right|8
|align=right|60||align=right|41||align=right|48
||Quarter-final
|
|-
|2000
|Tippeligaen
|align=right |6
|align=right|26||align=right|11||align=right|7||align=right|8
|align=right|42||align=right|29||align=right|40
||Quarter-final
|
|-
|2001
|Tippeligaen
|align=right bgcolor=silver|2
|align=right|26||align=right|17||align=right|5||align=right|4
|align=right|64||align=right|33||align=right|56
|bgcolor=cc9966|Semi-final
|
|-
|2002
|Tippeligaen
|align=right |7
|align=right|26||align=right|10||align=right|6||align=right|10
|align=right|37||align=right|30||align=right|36
||Third round
|
|-
|2003
|Tippeligaen
|align=right |7
|align=right|26||align=right|10||align=right|7||align=right|9
|align=right|33||align=right|35||align=right|37
||Fourth round
|
|-
|2004
|Tippeligaen
|align=right |7
|align=right|26||align=right|8||align=right|11||align=right|7
|align=right|45||align=right|33||align=right|35
|bgcolor=cc9966|Semi-final
|
|-
|2005
|Tippeligaen
|align=right |4
|align=right|26||align=right|12||align=right|6||align=right|8
|align=right|37||align=right|31||align=right|42
|bgcolor=silver|Final
|
|-
|2006
|Tippeligaen
|align=right |4
|align=right|26||align=right|12||align=right|8||align=right|6
|align=right|44||align=right|33||align=right|44
||Quarter-final
|
|-
|2007
|Tippeligaen
|align=right |4
|align=right|26||align=right|12||align=right|8||align=right|6
|align=right|47||align=right|28||align=right|44
|bgcolor=gold|Winner
|
|-
|2008
|Tippeligaen
|align=right |12
|align=right|26||align=right|7||align=right|7||align=right|12
|align=right|30||align=right|40||align=right|28
||Second round
|
|-
|2009
|Tippeligaen
|align=right |11
|align=right|30||align=right|9||align=right|10||align=right|11
|align=right|43||align=right|50||align=right|37
||Fourth round
|
|-
|2010
|Tippeligaen
|align=right |10
|align=right|30||align=right|9||align=right|13||align=right|8
|align=right|51||align=right|44||align=right|40
||Third round
|
|-
|2011
|Tippeligaen
|align=right |13
|align=right|30||align=right|9||align=right|7||align=right|14
|align=right|46||align=right|52||align=right|34
||Fourth round
|
|-
|2012
|Tippeligaen
|align=right |9
|align=right|30||align=right|9||align=right|12||align=right|9
|align=right|46||align=right|47||align=right|39
||Fourth round
|
|-
|2013
|Tippeligaen
|align=right |10
|align=right|30||align=right|9||align=right|9||align=right|12
|align=right|37||align=right|44||align=right|36
||Semi-final
|
|-
|2014
|Tippeligaen
|align=right |5
|align=right|30||align=right|13||align=right|7||align=right|10
|align=right|49||align=right|35||align=right|46
||Quarter-final
|
|-
|2015
|Tippeligaen
|align=right |8
|align=right|30||align=right|12||align=right|9||align=right|9
|align=right|45||align=right|43||align=right|44
||Third round
|
|-
|2016
|Tippeligaen
|align=right |12
|align=right|30||align=right|8||align=right|10||align=right|12
|align=right|45||align=right|50||align=right|34
||Third round
|
|-
|2017
|Eliteserien
|align=right |12
|align=right|30||align=right|10||align=right|7||align=right|13
|align=right|40||align=right|43||align=right|37
|bgcolor=gold|Winner
|
|-
|2018 
|Eliteserien
|align=right |12
|align=right|30||align=right|7||align=right|11||align=right|12
|align=right|34||align=right|44||align=right|32
||Semi-final
|
|-
|2019 
|Eliteserien
|align=right bgcolor="#FFCCCC"| 14
|align=right|30||align=right|7||align=right|9||align=right|14
|align=right|32||align=right|47||align=right|30
||Third round
|Relegated to 1. divisjon through play-offs
|-
|2020 
|1. divisjon
|align=right bgcolor=#DDFFDD| 2
|align=right|30||align=right|16||align=right|9||align=right|5
|align=right|49||align=right|26||align=right|57
||Cancelled
|Promoted Eliteserien 
|-
|2021 
|Eliteserien
|align=right |4
|align=right|30||align=right|14||align=right|7||align=right|9
|align=right|49||align=right|40||align=right|49
||Quarter-final
|
|-
|2022 
|Eliteserien
|align=right |4
|align=right|30||align=right|16||align=right|5||align=right|9
|align=right|49||align=right|34||align=right|53
||
|
|}

European record

Summary 

Pld = Matches played; W = Matches won; D = Matches drawn; L = Matches lost; GF = Goals for; GA = Goals against. Defunct competitions indicated in italics.

List of matches

Records 

Greatest home victory: 10–0 vs. Geithus, 4 October 1953
Greatest away victory: 7–0 vs. Stabæk, 20 March 2011
Heaviest home loss: 1–7 vs. Fredrikstad, 15 August 1954
Heaviest away loss: 1–7 vs. Odd, 7 June 1953
Highest attendance, Åråsen Stadion: 13,652 vs. Vålerenga, 16 May 2002
Highest average attendance, season: 9,018 in 2007
Most appearances, total: 720, Frode Kippe 1997–1998, 2002–2019
Most appearances, league: 441, Frode Kippe 1997–1998, 2002–2019
Most goals scored, total: 319, Tom Lund 1967–82
Most goals scored, league: 154, Tom Lund 1967–82
Most goals scored, season: 26, Tom Lund 1973

Current squad 

 

For season transfers, see transfers winter 2022–23 and transfers summer 2022.

Out on loan

Coaching staff

Academy

Administrative staff

Coaches 

  Alf Martinsen (1947–50), (1952–53)
  Karl Guðmundsson (1958), (1960)
  Ragnar Larsen (1962)
  Walther Svendsen (1963)
  Henry Mathiesen (1964–1965)
  Rolf Wahl (1966)
  Ivar Christiansen (1967)
  Rolf Wahl (1968)
  Svein Bergersen/ Rolf Wahl (1971)
  Oddvar Richardsen (1972)
  Joar Hoff (1973)
  Ronny Mathiesen (1974)
  Joar Hoff (1975–1976)
  Joe Hooley (1977–1980)
  Kjell Schou-Andreassen (1980–1982)
  Joar Hoff (1982)
  Bill Foulkes (1984)
  Tom Lund (1985–1988)
  David Hay (1989–1990)
  Tom Lund (1 July 1990 – 30 June 1991)
  Ivar Hoff (1991–1993)
  Teitur Þórðarson (1994– Sept 9, 1995)
  Arne Erlandsen/ Kjetil Osvold (Sept 10, 1995–1996)
  Per Brogeland (1996– 1 June 1997)
  Even Pellerud (1997)
  Arne Erlandsen (1998–2005)
  Uwe Rösler (2005–2007)
  Tom Nordlie (2007 – 29 May 2008)
  Erland Johnsen (caretaker) (29 May 2008 – 16 June 2008)
  Erland Johnsen (16 June 2008 – 21 Oct 2008)
  Henning Berg (21 Oct 2008 – 26 Oct 2011)
  Petter Belsvik/ Magnus Powell (caretakers) (26 Oct 2011–2012)
  Magnus Haglund (2012–2015)
  Rúnar Kristinsson (2015– 18 Sep 2016)
  Arne Erlandsen (20 Sep 2016 – 26 June 2018)
  Arild Sundgot (caretaker) (26 June 2018 – 13 July 2018)
  Jörgen Lennartsson (13 July 2018 – 2 December 2019)
  Tom Nordlie (caretaker) (3 December 2019 – 11 December 2019)
  Geir Bakke  (31 December 2019–)

Supporters 

Lillestrøm is one of the most supported clubs in Norway, and has the second biggest fan-club in Norway, as the official fan-club, Kanarifansen has more than 5,000 members. Kanarifansen was founded on 3 December 1992 and publishes its own magazines and has its own collection of clothing.

Rivalries 

Lillestrøm's biggest rival is Vålerenga Fotball. The club also has a rivalry with Rosenborg. Their traditional local rival dated back to the clubs foundation is Strømmen IF.

References

External links 

 
 "Kanari-Fansen", the Lillestrøm SK Supporters Club
 Stats, history and facts

 
Football clubs in Norway
Association football clubs established in 1917
Bandy clubs established in 1917
1917 establishments in Norway
Eliteserien clubs
Sport in Akershus